New Ways of Analyzing Variation (NWAV) is an annual academic conference in sociolinguistics. NWAV attracts researchers and students conducting linguistic scientific investigations into patterns of language variation, the study of language change in progress, and the interrelationship between language and society, including how language variation is shaped by and continually shapes societal institutions, social and interpersonal relationships, and individual and group identities.

The conference originated under the title New Ways of Analyzing Variation in English in October 1972 at Georgetown University; "English" was dropped from the conference title later as languages other than English entered the conference's focus. The most recent meeting, NWAV 50, was held in 2022 in San Jose, California, organized by Stanford University.

Past conferences

See also
 New Ways of Analyzing Variation Asia-Pacific
 Dialectology
 Linguistics conferences
 Sociolinguistics
 Variable rules analysis

References

External links
 NWAV 40 (Archive)
 NWAV 43 website (Chicago, 2014) 
 NWAV 44 website (Toronto, 2015)
 University of Pennsylvania Working Papers in Linguistics (PWPL)
 NWAV@35 Retrospective (Originally published in the NWAV 35 Program Booklet; By David Durian, The Ohio State University, with a foreword by Roger Shuy)
 American Dialect Society
 NWAV 42 (Carnegie Mellon University and University of Pittsburgh, 2013)
 NWAV 41 (Indiana University Bloomington, 2012)
 NWAV 39 (University of Texas, San Antonio, 2010)
 NWAV 38 (University of Ottawa, 2009)
 NWAV 36 (University of Pennsylvania, 2007)
 NWAV 35 (The Ohio State University, 2006)

Sociolinguistics
Academic conferences